Golconda is a ruined city and fortress in Telangana, India, fabled for its diamond mines.

Golconda may also refer to:

Places 
 Golconda, Illinois, U.S.
 Golconda, Nevada, U.S.
 Golconda Skate Park, Brooklyn, New York
 Golconda Subah, a Mughal imperial top-level province in India
 Golconda Sultanate, a former territory in Eastern Deccan, India
 Golconda, Tasmania, Australia
 Golconda, Trinidad and Tobago, a town in Trinidad and Tobago

Other uses 
 Golconda (Magritte), a 1953 painting by René Magritte
 Golconda diamonds, mined near former Golconda Sultanate, India
 List of ships named Golconda
 Golconda, a status in the game Vampire: The Masquerade
 The Queen of Golconda, 1863 Swedish-language opera by Franz Berwald

See also 
 
 La Gioconda (disambiguation)